Reparations are broadly understood as compensation given for an abuse or injury. The colloquial meaning of reparations has changed substantively over the last century. In the early 1900s, reparations were interstate exchanges (see war reparations) that were punitive mechanisms determined by treaty and paid by the surrendering side of conflict, such as the World War I reparations paid by Germany and its allies. Reparations are now understood as not only war damages but also compensation and other measures provided to victims of severe human rights violations by the parties responsible. The right of the victim of an injury to receive reparations and the duty of the part responsible to provide them has been secured by the United Nations.

In transitional justice, reparations are measures taken by the state to redress gross and systematic violations of human rights law or humanitarian law through the administration of some form of compensation or restitution to the victims. Of all the mechanisms of transitional justice, reparations are unique because they directly address the situation of the victims. Reparations, if well designed, acknowledge victims' suffering, offer measures of redress, as well as some form of compensation for the violations suffered. Reparations can be symbolic as well as material. They can be in the form of public acknowledgement of or apology for past violations, indicating state and social commitment to respond to former abuses.

Proponents of reparations assert that in order to be effective, reparations must be employed alongside other transitional justice measures such as prosecutions, truth-seeking, and institutional reform. Such mechanisms ensure that compensatory measures are not empty promises, temporary stopgap measures, or attempts to buy the silence of victims.

Types
The legal concept of reparation has two components: the right of the victim of an injury to receive reparation, and the duty of the party responsible for the injury to provide redress. Reparations can be sought by individuals through judicial systems, or they can be policies introduced by the state to address the concerns or needs of a wider populace. While the first strategy is instrumental in creating legal precedent, the second is a more efficient way to recognize the concerns of more people.

The United Nations Basic Principles and Guidelines on the Right to a Remedy and Reparation for Victims of Gross Violations of International Human Rights Law and Serious Violations of International Humanitarian Law describes five formal categories of reparations: restitution, compensation, rehabilitation, satisfaction, and guarantees of non-repetition.

 Restitution – measures which serve to "restore the victim to the original situation before the gross violations occurred". This can include: restoration of liberty, enjoyment of human rights, identity, family life and citizenship, return of one's place of residence, restoration of employment, and return of property.
 Damages Compensation – the provision of compensation "for any economically assessable damage, as appropriate and proportional to the gravity of the violation and the circumstances of each case". Such damage includes: physical or mental harm, lost opportunities, material damages and loss of earnings, moral damage, cost of legal, medical, psychological, and social services.
 Rehabilitation – medical, psychological, social services, and legal assistance
 Satisfaction – various measures which include the cessation of human rights violations and abuses, truth-seeking, searches for the disappeared, recovery and reburial of remains, judicial and administrative sanctions, public apologies, commemoration, and memorialization.
 Guarantees of non-repetition – reforms ensuring the prevention of future abuses, including: civilian control of the military and security forces, strengthening an independent judiciary, protection of civil service and human rights workers, the overall promotion of human rights standards, and the establishment of mechanisms to prevent and monitor social conflict and conflict resolution.

Who receives reparation
Victims of violations of international human rights or humanitarian law have the rights to prompt, sufficient, and effective reparation. Victims can be individuals or a collective group of individuals who suffered similar violations. Such victims, as defined by the UN Basic Principles on the matter, are:

"Persons who individually or collectively suffered harm, including physical or mental injury, emotional suffering, economic loss, or substantial impairment of their fundamental rights, through acts or omissions that constitute gross violations of international human rights law, or serious violations of international humanitarian law… the immediate family or dependants of the direct victim and persons who have suffered harm in intervening to assist victims in distress or to prevent victimization."

Who provides reparation
The state, as the authority responsible for ensuring the protection of human rights and the administration of justice within their borders, is correspondingly also responsible for providing redress for abuses and injustices suffered by their citizens. The UN Basic Principles also states that if a person or entity other than the state can be found liable for the violations and abuses endured, such party is responsible for providing reparation either directly to the victim or through compensating the state for reparations rendered.

The international legal underpinning for the right to effective remedy and duty to provide reparation can be found in multiple human rights and humanitarian treaties and conventions, including:

 The Universal Declaration of Human Rights – Article 8
 The International Covenant on Civil and Political Rights – Article 2
 The International Convention on the Elimination of All Forms of Racial Discrimination – Article 6
 The United Nations Convention Against Torture – Article 14
 The Convention on the Rights of the Child – Article 39
 The Hague Conventions respecting the Laws and Customs of War on Land – Article 3
 Protocol Additional to the Geneva Conventions relating to the Protection of Victims of International Armed Conflicts – Article 91
 The Rome Statute of the International Criminal Court (ICC) – Articles 79 and 75

Examples of reparations programs
Canada – For more than 100 years, Canada retained a practice of removing indigenous Canadian children from their families and placing them in church-run Indian residential schools (IRS). This process was part of an effort to homogenize Canadian society, and included the prohibition of native language and cultural practices. In 1991, the Canadian government established the Royal Commission on Aboriginal Peoples (RCAP), charged with exploring the relationship between aboriginal peoples, the government, and society.

As a result of the commission's recommendations, the government symbolically issued an apology in a "Statement of Reconciliation", admitting that the schools were designed on racist models of assimilation. Pope Benedict XVI also issued an apology on behalf of church members who were involved in the practice. In addition, the government provided a $350 million fund to help those affected by the schools. In 2006, the federal government signed the Indian Residential Schools Settlement Agreement, agreeing to provide reparations to the survivors of this program. The Settlement totals approximately $2 billion, and includes financial compensation, a truth commission, and support services.

In 2017 Prime Minister Justin Trudeau apologized to the lesbian, gay, bisexual, and transgender people of Canada in the House of Commons and announced reparations that would be made to citizens who were injured by specific actions of the State.

Chile – In 1990, Chile's newly elected president Patricio Aylwin created the National Truth and Reconciliation Commission to investigate the human rights abuses of General Augusto Pinochet's 1973-1990 dictatorial regime. The commission investigated disappearances, political executions, and torture, publishing the Rettig Report with its findings in 1991. Afterwards, its work was continued by the National Corporation for Reparations and Reconciliation. These programs recommended reparations for the victims, including: monthly pensions, educational benefits for the children of the disappeared, exemption from military service, and priority access to health services.

However, these initiatives have also been criticized on a variety of grounds, such as their refusal to identify the perpetrators of violence and their failure to recognize a comprehensive range of victims to whom reparations are due.

Morocco – In Morocco, the period between the 1960s and 1990s is often referred to as the "years of lead," referring to the massive human rights violations that occurred in the government's campaign of political oppression, including executions, torture, and the annihilation of other civil liberties. Shortly after he ascended the throne in 1999, King Mohammed VI created the Independent Arbitration Commission (IAC) to compensate the victims of forced disappearances and arbitrary detention. The IAC decided more than 5,000 cases and awarded a total of US$100 million, but victims and their families complained of lack of transparency in the tribunal's procedures and demanded truth seeking measures in addition to financial compensation.

These pressures were instrumental in leading to the 2004 creation of the Arab world's first official truth-seeking initiative, the Equity and Reconciliation Commission. The IER issued a reparations policy that upheld notions of gender equity
and resulted in roughly US$85 million in financial compensation paid to almost 10,000 individuals, as well as recommendations on other measures such as the provision of health care and restoration of civil rights. The IER's recommendations also led to
a collective reparations program that combined symbolic recognition of human rights violations with a development component in eleven regions that had suffered from collective punishment. As of May 2010, implementation of the collective reparations program was ongoing.

Other reparations programs have been proposed and/or implemented in: Argentina, Brazil, Cambodia, Colombia, the Democratic Republic of Congo, East Timor, El Salvador, Germany, Ghana, Guatemala, Haiti, Iraq, Malawi, Liberia, South Africa, Kenya, the
United States, and others.

Dignity takings and dignity restoration 
A dignity taking is the destruction or confiscation of property rights from owners or occupiers, where the intentional or unintentional outcome is dehumanization or infantilization. There are two requirements: (1) involuntary property destruction or confiscation and (2) dehumanization or infantilization. Dehumanization is “the failure to recognize an individual or group’s humanity” and infantilization is “the restriction of an individual or group’s autonomy based on the failure to recognize and respect their full capacity to reason.” Evidence of a dignity taking can be established empirically through either a top-down approach, examining the motive and intent behind those who initiated the taking, or a bottom-up approach, examining the viewpoints of dispossessed people.

When this larger harm called a dignity taking occurs, mere reparations (or compensation for physical things taken) are not enough. Dignity restoration is required. Dignity restoration is a remedy that seeks to provide dispossessed individuals and communities with material compensation through processes that affirm their humanity and reinforce their agency. In practical terms, the remedial process places dispossessed individuals or communities in the driver’s seat and gives them a significant degree of autonomy in deciding how they are made whole.

The dignity takings/dignity restoration framework was first created by Professor Bernadette Atuahene following her empirical exploration of land dispossession and restitution in South Africa in her book, We Want What’s Ours: Learning from South Africa’s Restitution Program (Oxford University Press 2014). Since then, many scholars across disciplines have applied these socio-legal concepts to an array of case studies in various time periods and geographic locations, providing a transnational, historicized approach to understanding involuntary property loss and its material and non-material consequences.

The dignity takings/dignity restoration framework provides a lexicon to describe and analyze property takings from poor and vulnerable populations across the globe in different historical periods; focuses on redress by linking events of property dispossession to highlight opportunities for learning, resistance, and solidarity; allows people who are not property scholars to participate in the conversation about involuntary property loss and adequate remedies; captures both the material and immaterial consequences of property confiscation; and inserts dignity into the scholarly discourse about property, countering the singular focus on efficiency, which has dominated legal analysis since the ascendancy of law and economics.

Potential problems
There are logistical problems inherent in reparations, such as clearly defining the objectives, goals, and processes by which reparations will be distributed, determining how to address a range of atrocities with streamlined programs, or balancing economic development with financing reparation efforts. Some experts suggest that the problems lie in the very definition of reparations themselves.

The right to seek and obtain reparations is vested with the state whose citizens suffered the losses, but individuals are barred from pursuing a claim for compensation directly against the state that wronged them. The grant of reparations is thus a political question, and individuals who suffered harm may be left undercompensated or uncompensated.

The UN's guidelines on reparations could be contested on the fact that they equate human rights violations with violations of civil and political rights, ignoring abuses of economic, social, and cultural rights. The guidelines explicitly state that their intent is to restore victims to their status in a time of peace, but the distribution of rights and resources often wasn't equal in peacetime. Thus reparations, if their intent is to return a society to its status quo, run the risk of ignoring systemic oppression and reproducing social hierarchies.

For instance, reparations programs have been critiqued for ignoring the needs of women in transitional justice processes. In 2007, women's groups mobilized to examine how reparations policies could be more responsive to victims of gender-based violence. Their efforts led to the "Nairobi Declaration on Women's and Girl's Right to a Remedy and Reparation," which states that "reparations must go above and beyond the immediate reasons and consequences of the crimes and violations; they must aim to address the political and structural inequalities that negatively shape women's and girl's lives."

Some of these concerns can be addressed by empowering women to have a voice in the reparations process, challenging discriminatory practices, and educating communities about sexual violence.

In addition to gender-based discrimination, children are often excluded from reparations procedures. The reasons of this are varied; reparations often fall in the hands of parents and are only indirectly given to children, and reparations programs often do not take into account the fact that children and adults are affected differently by violence. Thus reparations should also have a child-specific component to target abuses that are specifically suffered by children.

See also
 Reparations for slavery
 Holocaust reparations

References

Further reading
 
 
 
 
  (HTML version)

External links
The International Center for Transitional Justice's (ICTJ) Reparations Page
Protocol Additional to the Geneva Conventions relating to the Protection of Victims of International Armed Conflicts
Assembly of First Nations: "AFN National Chief Says Private Audience with Pope Benedict XVI in Vatican City "Closes the Circle" and Enables Work Towards Reconciliation for Residential School Survivors"
 Introductory note by Theo van Boven, procedural history note and audiovisual material on the Basic Principles and Guidelines on the Right to a Remedy and Reparation for Victims of Gross Violations of International Human Rights Law and Serious Violations of International Humanitarian Law in the Historic Archives of the United Nations Audiovisual Library of International Law
 

Human rights
International law